Maryvonne Briot (born 4 February 1959) is a French former politician from the UMP who served as Member of Parliament for Haute-Saône's 2nd constituency from 2002 to 2007.

See also 

 List of deputies of the 12th National Assembly of France

References 

Living people
1959 births
Deputies of the 12th National Assembly of the French Fifth Republic

People from Haute-Saône
Union for a Popular Movement politicians
21st-century French women politicians
Women members of the National Assembly (France)